Deep is a 2017 English-language Spanish-Belgian-Swiss computer-animated science fiction adventure film directed by Julio Soto Gurpide. Inspiration for the film came from Julio's deep sea diving experiences.

Plot
In a post-apocalyptic future the planet was subjected to an ecological catastrophe, and as a result the Earth was flooded. At the same time, sea inhabitants also suffered a catastrophe. The Kraken managed to save several inhabitants and formed a safe place to live with them, which is a colony located in the deep sea of the Atlantic Ocean.

Kraken's grandson, Deep, considers life to be boring, but shows an interest in objects made by humans. He also involves his friends: anglerfish Evo and shrimp Alice. Soon one of Deep's "pranks" accidentally endangers the inhabitants of his home and encloses them by stones. Deep learns from Kraken that only the white whale Nathan can help them, and tells his grandson the necessary landmarks to identify where Nathan can be found. Deep, Evo and Alice set out to find Nathan.

After passing several landmarks, the friends get to the Titanic, where they find the vampire squid  Norma. She makes them listen to her musical performance, and tells them that in order to find Nathan, they need to get to Broadway. The heroes leave the ship with difficulty, since Norma would not let them go.

Along the way, Deep is attacked by the Moray eel Maura, but immediately after hearing from him that he has friends, she admits that she is lonely. Deep adds Maura to the team, despite the fact that Alice and Evo are against taking a predator that almost ate them on the first night.

Having reached the Brooklyn Bridge, the friends find themselves surrounded by crabs, where their leader, the yeti crab Rico, challenges them to a dance battle. Alice's performance strikes Rico, and he falls in love with her. After that, the heroes pass the Brooklyn Bridge onto the streets of flooded New York City. They enter the radiation zone and overcome a number of zombie piranhas.

The characters have a disagreement when it becomes apparent they are lost, and everyone accuses Deep of taking them on a dangerous journey. They meet the penguin Darcy and his assistants: the walrus Luigi and the dolphin Ralph. While Darcy and Luigi distract the main characters by watching the film about the project "Ark-1" and "Ark-2" (which are spacecraft that saved humans and ground animals respectively, by leaving the Earth and settling another planet), they discuss the plan to freeze them and leave the Earth on the "Ark-3" (which is for aquatic animals).

When the heroes are placed in a trap, they finally met Nathan, who is chained, and immediately learn of Darcy's plan to freeze everyone, including Maura, who had not fallen into the trap. Deep, Alice and Evo manage to disable the cell without letting it freeze, and then get out of the locked cell and join Maura in battle against Darcy, Luigi and Ralph. As a result, they triumph over the trio and are ejected from the in-motion "Ark-3" along with Nathan and the other sea creatures.

Returning home, the characters, along with Nathan, begin to free Kraken and the others, and Deep nearly sacrifices his life to completely free himself of the debris. After liberation, Maura offers an idea where it will be possible to start fertilizing and increase the population, while Deep finds love. Darcy, Ralph and Luigi are stranded on a floating ice floe in the Arctic Ocean near Greenland crying out for help.

Cast
 Justin Felbinger as Deep, a yellow grimpoteuthis, Kraken's grandson, main protagonist
 Stephen Hughes as Evo, a clumsy anglerfish
 Lindsey Alena as Alice, a neurotic shrimp
 Elisabeth Gray as Maura, a vegetarian moray eel
 Dwight Schultz as Kraken, an elderly colossal squid, Deep's grandpa
 William Salyers as Darcy, an emperor penguin that is the commander of the Ark-3, main antagonist
 Bob Bergen as Ralph, a bottlenose dolphin with low intelligence, one of Darcy's minions
 Jess Harnell as Luigi, an Italian-accented walrus, one of Darcy's minions
 Phil LaMarr as Artie a crayfish who serves as a advisor for Kraken.
 Lewis MacLeod as Nathan, a Scottish-accented sperm whale with red eyes
 Joe Hernandez as Rico, a Brooklyn-accented yeti crab
 Anna Vocino as Norma, a purple vampire squid named after Norma Desmond from Sunset Boulevard

Reception
On Rotten Tomatoes the film has an approval rating of 33% based on reviews from 6 critics.

References

External links
 

2017 films
2010s computer-animated films
Belgian animated films
Fictional octopuses
Spanish animated films
Swiss animated films
Spanish science fiction adventure films
Sea adventure films
Films about cephalopods
Animated films about fish
Animated films set in New York City
Animated post-apocalyptic films
Films scored by Fernando Velázquez
Films set in Greenland
Underwater civilizations in fiction
Environmental films
Fiction set in the 2100s
Films set in the future
2010s English-language films
2010s Spanish films